Gustav von der Mülbe (11 December 1831 – 12 February 1917) was a Prussian Generalleutnant.

Mülbe was born in Braunschweig in the Duchy of Brunswick. He was the son of Friedrich von der Mülbe (1806–1859) and Agnes, née von Bothmer (1804–1841). In Liegnitz on 27 June 1869, Mülbe married Eleonore von Tschirschky (1843–1915); the couple had three daughters. Mülbe died in Erfurt.

1831 births
1917 deaths
German untitled nobility
People from the Duchy of Brunswick
Military personnel from Braunschweig
Lieutenant generals of Prussia